Shachtman or Shactman is a surname. Notable people with the name include:

 Brian Shactman, American journalist for CNBC and MSNBC
 Max Shachtman (1904–1972), American Marxist theorist
 Noah Shachtman, American journalist, editor-in-chief of Rolling Stone
 Tom Shachtman (born 1942), American author and filmmaker